The Church of Jesus Christ of Latter-day Saints in Vanuatu refers to the Church of Jesus Christ of Latter-day Saints (LDS Church) and its members in Vanuatu.  As of 2019, there were 10,210 members in 37 congregations, making it the third largest body of LDS Church members in Melanesia behind Papua New Guinea and Fiji. Vanuatu has the most LDS Church members per capita in Melanesia, and the sixth most members per capita of any country in the world, behind Tonga, Samoa, Kiribati, the Marshall Islands, and the Federated States of Micronesia.

History

Tongan members moved to New Hebrides (now Vanuatu) in the early 1970s. A branch was formed in Port Vila on July 15, 1973. Additional congregations emerged and the Port Vila District was created October 19, 1996. The Luganville District was organized September 27, 1998. The Port Vila Vanuatu Stake was created on Sunday June 21, 2015 with 2,000 in attendance.

Stake & Districts
As of February 2023, the following stake and districts exist in Vanuatu:

Mission
Missionaries from the Fiji Suva mission first arrived in Vanuatu in 1974. It continued to be part of the Fiji Suva Mission until 2012. In July 2012, the Fiji Suva and Papua New Guinea Port Moresby Missions were divided to create the Vanuatu Port Vila Mission. The Vanuatu Port Vila Mission encompasses the islands of New Caledonia, Vanuatu, and The Solomon Islands.

New Caledonia

Solomon Islands
The first branch of the LDS Church in the Solomon Islands was organized February 4, 1996. Additional branches formed and the Honiara Solomon Islands District was organized on November 27, 2011. In 2021, the district included 1,374 members in five branches (Burns Creek Branch, Honiara Branch, and White River Branch in Honiara, Auki Branch, and Fauabu Malaita Branch).

Temples
On October 4, 2020 the Port Vila Vanuatu Temple was announced by church president Russell M. Nelson. Groundbreaking was scheduled for March 4, 2023.

See also
Religion in Vanuatu

References

External links
 The Church of Jesus Christ of Latter-day Saints (Pacific) - Official Site
 The Church of Jesus Christ of Latter-day Saints - Pacific Newsroom
 ComeUntoChrist.org Latter-day Saints Visitor site

Religion in Vanuatu
 
Vanuatu